Prince of Tyre may refer to:

Amalric, Lord of Tyre (c. 1272–1310), ruler in Tyre (now Lebanon)
Pericles, Prince of Tyre, play written at least in part by William Shakespeare

See also
Apollonius of Tyre